Baillo is a Spanish surname. Notable people with the surname include:

 Jorge Gómez Baillo (born 1959), Argentine chess master
 José Antonio Sánchez Baíllo (born 1953), Spanish painter and engraver

Spanish-language surnames